Malishka is a village and rural municipal community of the Yeghegnadzor Municipality of the Vayots Dzor Province of Armenia.

Economy 
Almost all of the population lives by subsistence farming. The only other places of employment in the village are the two village schools, the two kindergartens, or one of the many "khanuts" (shops).

Education 
Peace Corps volunteers have been active in Malishka, having taught English and holding after-school English clubs at Malishka Secondary School no. 1.

Gallery

References

External links 

Populated places in Vayots Dzor Province
Communities in Vayots Dzor Province